Established in 2000, Dubai Holding Group is an Emirati multinational retail organization in the Middle East, representing fashion franchises.

The Group represents prominent brands such as Zara, Zara Home, Stradivarius (Inditex), women’secret, Gerard Darel, Flamant (company), Promod, Harrys of London, Sfera & Delvaux (company).

History
Operating over the past 15 years, Dubai Holding Group have opened various stores across The UAE, Oman, Qatar, Bahrain, Kuwait, with brands from six different countries. The first brand to join the group was the Spanish brand Stradivarius (Inditex), the women's clothing line belonging to Inditex. Their most recent franchise is with Delvaux (company). Primarily a fashion franchiser, the Group ventured into home textiles with Zara Home in 2008, followed shortly by Flamant (company) in 2014.

Timeline

2000: Stradivarius opens in Dubai, Dubai Holding Group's first store

2001: Zara opens in Abu Dhabi
Stradivarius opens in Abu Dhabi
women’secret opens in Abu Dhabi
Promod opens in Qatar
Promod opens in Abu Dhabi
women’secret opens in Dubai

2007: women’secret opens in Sharjah
Gerard Darel opens in Abu Dhabi

2008: Zara Home opens in Abu Dhabi
Promod opens in Oman
women’secret opens in Bahrain

2009: Gerard Darel opens in Dubai

2010: Stradivarius opens in Qatar

2012: Promod opens in Fujairah
Harry’s of London opens in Dubai

2014: Flamant opens in Dubai
Sfera opens in Abu Dhabi

2015: Delvaux opens in Kuwait

2020: Jhelica in UAE

References

External links
 Dubai Holding Group
 Zara
 Zara Home
 Stradivarius
 women'secret
 Gerard Darel
 Flamant
 Promod
 Harrys of London
 Sfera
 Delvaux
Jhelica

Retail companies established in 2000
Retail companies of the United Arab Emirates
Conglomerate companies of the United Arab Emirates
2000 establishments in the United Arab Emirates